Pero Menalo (born March 10, 1989) is a Croatian former footballer who played as a midfielder. He is currently the director of sports for HNK Čapljina.

Club career

Bosnia 
Menalo had a trial session with HŠK Zrinjski Mostar in the summer of 2010. He would play in the First League of the Federation of Bosnia and Herzegovina with HNK Čapljina for the 2010-11 season. The following season he would play in the country's top tier the Premier League of Bosnia and Herzegovina with GOSK Gabela. He would make his debut for the club on March 11, 2012, against FK Slavija Sarajevo. In total, he would appear in 3 matches. 

After his brief stint in the top tier, he would play with HNK Visici in the Second League of the Federation of Bosnia and Herzegovina. In 2013, he returned to the second tier to sign with his former club Čapljina.

Canada  
In the summer of 2014, he played abroad in the Canadian Soccer League initially with Milton SC and later was transferred to league rivals Toronto Croatia before the roster freeze on September 1, 2014. In his debut season with Toronto, he finished as the club's top goal scorer with 7 goals and secured a postseason berth by finishing second in the First Division. In the opening round of the playoffs, he contributed a goal against SC Waterloo Region which helped the Croats advance to the next round. He would appear in the CSL Championship final against York Region Shooters where Toronto was defeated in a penalty shootout. 

Menalo would re-sign with Toronto for the 2015 season. He assisted the Croats in securing a playoff spot by finishing as runner's up in the top division. He would make his second championship final appearance against Waterloo where Toronto successfully secured the title. 

In 2018, he would sign with the expansion franchise CSC Mississauga. He returned to Mississauga for the 2019 season. In the summer of 2019, he made a brief return to Toronto Croatia for the 2019 Croatian World Club Championship and was featured in the tournament final against SC Croat San Pedro but lost the series.

Managerial career 
Menalo was named the director of sports for his former club HNK Čapljina in 2022.

Personal life  
He is the brother of Luka Menalo who is also a footballer.

References  
 

Living people
1989 births
Association football midfielders
Croatian footballers
HNK Čapljina players
NK GOŠK Gabela players 
Milton SC players
Toronto Croatia players
Premier League of Bosnia and Herzegovina players
First League of the Federation of Bosnia and Herzegovina players
Canadian Soccer League (1998–present) players
People from Čapljina